1theK Originals, formerly LOEN TV (Hangul: 로엔 TV), is a South Korean web series, produced by Kakao M. It is shown on the label's official YouTube channel.

History

2011: Debut
LOEN TV started in 2011, also going under the name LOEN Bangsong (로엔 방송, LOEN broadcast). At first, it only covered IU. It has six episodes.

2012: Comeback
In 2012, LOEN TV came back with three new episodes covering IU's Japanese tour.

2012: Introduction of segments
In the same year, LOEN TV launched segments. Ask in a Box started in October 2012 with Gain as debut star followed by CSI: Coming Soon Interview (Girl's Day), Let's Dance (November 2012, Girl's Day), LOEN TV Live (December 2012, Sunny Hill and Yoon Hyun-sang), Special Feature (December 2012, Kim Sung-kyu), Run to You (March 2013, Kim Tae-woo), I'M: Introduce Myself (April 2013, Yoo Ji-ae) and Wonder Live (September 2013, Lyn).

2014
Due to the change of LOEN's music distribution brand from LOEN Music to 1theK, the web series became "1theK Originals".

Background

Segments
As of 2015, it has 14 segments.

Ask in a Box
It is about asking guest artists different questions. LOEN gets the questions from "likers" (subscribers) of its Facebook page (fb.me/1theK).

2014
 2014.7.25 - B1A4
 2014.5.15 - EXO-K
 2014.5.14 - EXO-K
 2014.1.8 - TVXQ

2013
 2013.12.5 - 2AM
 2013.10.17 - IU
 2013.9.18 - G-Dragon
 2013.9.1 - Seungri
 2013.8.13 - Brown Eyed Girls
 2013.7.29 - XIA
 2013.7.16 - Dynamic Duo
 2013.6.25 - Sistar
 2013.5.27 - Lee Min-ho
 2013.5.23 - 2PM
 2013.4.11 - Infinite
 2013.2.5 - MYNAME
 2013.1.24 - Ock Joo-hyun
 2013.1.20 - Boyfriend
 2013.1.2 - Sunny Hill

2012
 2012.12.9 - Lee Seung-gi
 2012.11.30 - Orange Caramel
 2012.11.27 - Roh Ji-hoon
 2012.11.14 - Noel
 2012.11.11 - B.A.P
 2012.11.6 - Girl's Day
 2012.11.4 - Ailee
 2012.11.1 - Block B
 2012.10.31 - John Park
 2012.10.29 - Secret
 2012.10.25 - K.Will
 2012.10.17 - Ga-in

CSI: Comeback Special Interview

It shows interviews on guest artists and their new releases (album, single etc.). It was formerly called CSI: Coming Soon Interview until October 10, 2013.

2014
 2014.2.5 - Ga-in (with Show Lo) Truth or Dare
 2014.2.2 - B.A.P 1004 (Angel)
 2014.1.26 - Sunny Hill Don't Say Anything
 2014.1.17 - Gary No Cut Special: Gary's Special Confession
 2014.1.15 - Gary Shower Later / Zotto Mola
 2014.1.12 - B1A4 Lonely

2013
 2013.12.8 - Sweet Sorrow Again and Again
 2013.11.21 - History What am I to You
 2013.11.20 - San E  Break-Up Dinner (featuring Sanchez)
 2013.10.24 -  Shin Seung-hun  Sorry
 2013.10.10 - Nine Muses Gun
 2013.9.26 - Song Jieun False Hope
 2013.8.29 - KARA Damaged Lady
 2013.8.21 - Sunmi 24 Hours
 2013.8.7 - Girl's Day DEUX 20th Anniversary Tribute Album Part I: In Summer
 2013.6.16 - Choi Jin-hyuk Best Wishes to You
 2013.6.2 - Rainbow Sunshine
 2013.5.8 - Orange Caramel, 10cm re;code Episode IV: Hug Song
 2013.5.2 - UV Because of You
 2013.4.4 - Ga-in, Cho Hyung-woo Brunch
 2013.4.3 - Sunny Hill, Daybreak Love Actually
 2013.3.27 - Ra.D Thank You
 2013.3.14 - Davichi  Just the Two of Us
 2013.3.12 - Girl's Day Expect
 2013.2.25 - Woo-hyun, Lucia re;code Episode II: Cactus
 2013.2.20 - Jeong Hyeong-don and Daejune Hemensahang / Get Out
 2013.2.17 - SHINee Dream Girl
 2013.2.11 - Nu'est Hello
 2013.1.29 - Sistar19 Gone Not Around Any Longer
 2013.1.21 - Eric Nam  Heaven's Door
 2013.1.1 - Baek Ji-young Hate

2012
 2012.12.12 - Sunny Hill Goodbye to Romance
 2012.12.10 - Jung-yup No More Us
 2012.12.6 - 100% (A) Guy Like Me
 2012.12.4 - Kim Jang-hoon Someday
 2012.12.2 - Secret Talk That, Nell White Night
 2012.11.25 - Boom Beautiful
 2012.11.21 - Lee Seung-gi Return
 2012.11.20 - Spica  Lonely
 2012.11.13 - C-Clown Far Away... Young Love
 2012.11.8 - Boyfriend I Yah, Fiestar We Don't Stop
 2012.11.5 - Roh Ji-hoon Punishment
 2012.10.30 - Geeks re;code Episode I: Officially Missing You, Too
 2012.10.26 - Girl's Day Don't Forget Me

Let's Dance
It teaches viewers moves from the latest K-pop dance crazes.

2014
 2014.4.2 - Crayon Pop "Uh-ee"
 2014.3.17 - Orange Caramel "Catallena"
 2014.2.13 - Ladies' Code "So Wonderful"
 2014.1.22 - Got7 "Girls Girls Girls"
 2014.1.20 - Dal Shabet "B.B.B (Big Baby Baby)"
 2014.1.6 - Girl's Day "Something"

2013
 2013.12.22 - Secret "I Do I Do"
 2013.12.15 - Nine Muses "Glue"
 2013.12.4 - History "What am I to You"
 2013.12.2 - Tasty "Day 'n Night"
 2013.11.4 -  Fiestar "I Don't Know"
 2013.11.3 -  A-JAX "Snake"
 2013.10.23 - Nine Muses "Gun"
 2013.10.22 - BESTie " Love Options"
 2013.10.20 - Kahi "It's Me" (featuring Dumbfoundead)
 2013.10.16 - Tiny-G "Miss You"
 2013.9.23 - KARA "Damaged Lady"
 2013.9.4 - Teen Top "Rocking"
 2013.8.28 - Nu'est "Sleep Talking"
 2013.8.26 - History "Tell Me Love"
 2013.8.19 - Tasty "MAMAMA"
 2013.8.5 - Crayon Pop "Bar Bar Bar"
 2013.7.18 - BESTie " Pitapat"
 2013.7.10 - MYNAME "Baby I'm Sorry"
 2013.7.2 - Dal Shabet " Be Ambitious"
 2013.6.30 - Sunny Hill "Darling of All Hearts" (featuring Hareem)
 2013.6.10 - Rainbow "Sunshine"
 2013.5.29 - 100% "Want U Back"
 2013.5.22 - Nine Muses "WILD"
 2013.5.15 - Secret "YooHoo"
 2013.5.13 - SHINee "Why So Serious?"
 2013.5.12 - T-ara N4 "Jeon Won Diary"
 2013.4.24 - C-Clown "Shaking Heart"
 2013.3.20 - Girl's Day "Expect"
 2013.3.18 - RaNia "Just Go"
 2013.3.4 - Teen Top "Miss Right"
 2013.2.27 - Nu'est "Hello"
 2013.2.24 - B.A.P "One Shot"
 2013.2.4 - Nine Muses "Dolls"
 2013.1.31 - DMTN "Safety Zone"
 2013.1.28 - Tiny-G "Minimanimo"
 2013.1.7 - GLAM "I Like That"

2012
 2012.12.11 - Spica "Lonely"
 2012.12.4 - Secret "Talk That"
 2012.11.13 - Girl's Day "Don't Forget Me"

LOEN TV Live
It features live performances and interviews on artists.

2014
 2014.1.19 - Rumble Fish

2013
 2013.8.25 - Bumkey, San E
 2013.8.6 - Kim Greem
 2013.7.18 - Sweet Sorrow
 2013.4.21 - Lunafly
 2013.4.10 - Sunny Hill, Daybreak
 2013.3.24 - Bobby Kim, Kingston Rudieska
 2013.3.12 - Lim Jeong-hee, Herz Analog

2012
 2012.12.27 - Sunny Hill
 2012.12.23 - Sunny Hill
 2012.12.20 - Roh Ji-hoon
 2012.12.19 - Ailee
 2012.12.16 - Sunny Hill, Yoon Hyun-sang

Special Feature
It features interview on an artist, with a twist. The twist is that the interviewer is the same artist.

2013
 2013.7.7 - John Park Baby
 2013.4.7 - K.Will Love Blossom
 2013.3.28 - Choiza Going Down
 2013.2.19 - Kim Tae-woo Cosmic Girl
 2013.1.27 - Moon Hee-joon I'm Not OK
 2013.1.6 - JeA While You're Sleeping

2012
 2012.12.17 - Kim Sung-kyu 60 Seconds / I Need You

Run to You
It features a special live event presented by a K-pop artist.

 2013.12.3 - Fiestar
 2013.8.1 - Koyote
 2013.7.9 - Sunny Hill
 2013.6.26 - Baek A-yeon
 2013.4.16 - Jun Guk-gu of Gag Concert
 2013.3.7 - Kim Tae-woo

I'M: Introduce Myself
It aims to introduce "rookies" (new singers) of K-pop.

2014
 2014.2.9 - Soyou, Junggigo

2013
 2013.12.25 - Swings
 2013.11.25 - Shin Ji-hoon
 2013.11.24 - 100% V
 2013.11.18 - NC.A
 2013.11.7 - Led Apple
 2013.10.27 - Fiestar
 2013.10.13 - MYNAME
 2013.10.7 - Kye Bum-joo
 2013.9.24 - Electroboyz
 2013.9.15 - BTS
 2013.9.9 - Ladies' Code
 2013.8.12 - Tasty
 2013.7.21 - A-JAX
 2013.7.11 - BESTie
 2013.6.17 - Park Mu-jin
 2013.5.7 - History
 2013.4.29 - Yoo Ji-ae

Wonder Live
It is a mini-concert from an artist.

2014
 2014.1.28 - Zia Have You Ever Cried and three more songs
 2014.1.16 - MC the Max Wind That Blows and three more songs

2013
 2013.12.18 - Bumkey, Verbal Jint Only for You and three more songs
 2013.11.21 - Park Ji-yoon Mr. Lee (featuring San E) and four more songs
 2013.10.29 -  K.Will You Don't Know Love, Lay Back, I'll Be with You and three more songs
 2013.9.3 - Lyn I Like This Song, Song for Love and a short medley of five songs

Mini-Programs

History's ToryTory BangBang
Called a "short-com" (comedy short film), it starred the boy band History and premiered on June 6, 2013. It tackles about the group members' lives before their debut. It had five episodes and ended on July 4, 2013.

Fiestar's A-HA! For the Global K-pop Fan
It is an educational show featuring Fiestar's leader Jei, vocalist Cao Lu and lead rapper Cheska. It caters  for international viewers who wants to learn the Korean language. The first video is released on July 26, 2013, with their main topic, "Daebak", with Jei speaking Korean, Cheska in English, and Cao Lu translating it in Chinese. The last video, "Kkuljaem", was uploaded on October 24, 2013.

 2013.7.26 - Daebak
 2013.8.1 - Deuktem
 2013.8.8 - Tteokbap
 2013.8.15 - Jjal
 2013.8.22 - Doljikgu
 2013.8.29 - Anseup
 2013.9.5 - Menbung
 2013.9.12 - Real
 2013.9.26 - Dotne
 2013.10.3 - Bolmae
 2013.10.10 - Cri
 2013.10.17 - Gaenso
 2013.10.24 - Kkuljaem

Oven Radio
It is a five-minute program resembled to a radio show, airing for five days.

It was supposed to start in October 2013 and to be hosted by Jung Joon-young, but was cancelled. It finally started the following month with Lee Juck as host.

EXO's Oven Radio
 2013.12.9 - Episode 1 Miracles in December, Episode 2 Christmas Day
 2013.12.10 - Episode 3 The Star
 2013.12.11 - Episode 4 My Turn to Cry
 2013.12.12 - Episode 5 The First Snow

Lee Juck's Oven Radio
 2013.11.10 - Episode 1 Before Sunrise
 2013.11.11 - Episode 2 20 Years After
 2013.11.12 - Episode 3 What Do You See
 2013.11.13 - Episode 4 Is There Anybody
 2013.11.14 - Episode 5 Lie Lie Lie

References

External links
 NEW 1theK Originals - a playlist by LOENENT
 LOEN TV - a playlist by loenIU

Kakao M
2011 web series debuts
2010s YouTube series
YouTube channels launched in 2011